Witness is an album released by Spooky Tooth in 1973.  For this album, original drummer Mike Kellie returned and substantially replaced Bryson Graham.  Gary Wright remained the dominant songwriter at this stage of the band's history.  Co-lead singer Mike Harrison left the band following the release of the album. The album was remastered and re-released on compact disc (CD) in January 2005 by Repertoire Records.

The album art cover features the Eye of Providence.

Track listing
All songs written by Gary Wright, except where noted.

Side one
"Ocean of Power" – 4:40
"Wings on My Heart" – 3:32
"As Long as the World Keeps Turning" – 3:40
"Don't Ever Stray Away" (Chris Stewart, Wright) – 3:14
"Things Change" – 4:19

Side two
<li>"All Sewn Up" (Mick Jones, Wright) – 3:44
<li>"Dream Me a Mountain" – 3:31
<li>"Sunlight of My Mind" – 4:56
<li>"Pyramids" (Mike Kellie, Wright) – 4:28

Personnel
Spooky Tooth
 Mike Harrison – lead and backing vocals, percussion
 Mick Jones – electric and acoustic guitars, backing vocals
 Gary Wright – keyboards, backing and lead vocals, synthesizer
 Chris Stewart –  bass
 Mike Kellie – drums, percussion

Other credits
 Brian Humphries – engineer
 Takeo Komatsuzaki – liner notes
 Chris Welch – liner notes
 Tom Wilkes – photography and album design

References

External links
 
 

1973 albums
Spooky Tooth albums
Island Records albums
Albums recorded at Olympic Sound Studios